Bradley Bolke (October 1, 1925 – January 15, 2019) was an American voice actor.

Early life 
Bolke was born on October 1, 1925, in New York City. He later lived in Dobbs Ferry, New York. His brother was actor Dayton Allen.

He was the son of Helen and Sol Bolke, a dress manufacturer.

Filmography

References

External links
 

1925 births
2019 deaths
American male voice actors
People from Dobbs Ferry, New York
Male actors from New York City